Rhetus periander, the Periander metalmark or variable beautymark, is a butterfly of the family Riodinidae. It is found in most of Central America and South America, ranging from Mexico to Brazil and Argentina.

Subspecies
The following subspecies are recognised:
Rhetus periander arthuriana (Goiás, Brazil)
Rhetus periander eleusinus (Brazil: São Paulo, Santa Catarina and Rio de Janeiro)
Rhetus periander periander (Suriname)
Rhetus periander laonome (Colombia)
Rhetus periander naevianus (Honduras to Costa Rica)

Reproduction

Female Rhetus Periander search for the host plants to lay eggs on. This is done on the hottest hours of the day. The average number of eggs laid are 1-2. The process from egg to full adult for Rhetus Periander is a full 50 days.

References

3. Kaminski, L.A., (2015) Natural history and systematic position of Rhetus belphegor , Introduction

Riodinini
Butterflies described in 1777
Taxa named by Pieter Cramer